Julbestyr på en bondgård (Christmas Preparations on a Farm) was the 1958 edition of Sveriges Radio's Christmas Calendar.

Plot
Rolf Bergström from Sveriges Radio's children's section goes to an Uppland farm in Sweden, where he joins in the Christmas preparations together with the farmer's three children, Gunnel (14 years old), Magnus (12), and baby brother Gunnar (6). Their mother Anna-Lisa and their father Erik also take part in the programmes. In each episode, one of the children sings a Christmas song.

References

1958 radio programme debuts
1958 radio programme endings
Sveriges Radio's Christmas Calendar